MMAA is an acronym for Methylmalonic aciduria type A protein, mitochondrial. It can also refer to:

Minnesota Museum of American Art
Minnesota Martial Arts Academy
MMAA ICAO code for General Juan N. Álvarez International Airport